Sam Gold is an American theater director and actor. He has directed both musicals and plays, on Broadway and Off-Broadway. He won the 2015 Tony Award for Best Direction of a Musical for Fun Home.

Early life
Gold was raised in Westchester and New York City. His father, Jeffrey, is an investment banker, and his mother, Lenore, is a painter. He graduated from  Cornell University with a degree in English and had internships at Playwrights Horizons and the Signature Theater, and attended the directing program at the Juilliard School. He spent three years as an assistant director and dramaturge at the Wooster Group. He explained that "my career has been very focused on brand-new plays for a while. But, always, the reason I got into the theatre was because I was inspired by these classics. I was an English major and I loved the plays, so I think my work with new writers has always been based on my information from these old plays..." Gold is the Resident Director at the Roundabout Theatre Company.

Career 
On Broadway, he directed Seminar in 2011, a revival of Picnic in 2013 for the Roundabout Theatre Company, The Realistic Joneses in 2014, and The Real Thing in 2014 for the Roundabout Theatre Company.

He directed Fun Home on Broadway in 2015, in a Public Lab at The Public Theater in October 2012, and Off-Broadway  at The Public Theater in 2013. For Fun Home, he won the 2015 Tony Award, Best Direction of a Musical and 2014 Obie Award, Musical Theater.

His Off-Broadway directing work began with The Black Eyed at the New York Theatre Workshop in 2007. He directed The Big Meal by Dan LeFranc in 2012 at Playwrights Horizons and won the 2012 Lucille Lortel Award, Outstanding Director.
Gold has directed five of the plays of Annie Baker: Circle Mirror Transformation in 2009, The Aliens in 2010, an adaption of Uncle Vanya in 2012,The Flick in 2013, and John in 2015. According to an article in The New York Times, "Mr. Gold and Ms. Baker are reluctant to disclose much about themselves or their work together." In 2010, he also directed a reading of her play Nocturama at the Manhattan Theatre Club.

Gold won the 2010 Obie Award, Directing, for Circle Mirror Transformation and the 2016 Special Citation Obie Award for Collaboration between Gold, Baker, and the design team. The New York Times reviewer wrote that "Sam Gold has directed with an uncommonly observant eye and ear." He was nominated for the 2016 Drama Desk Award, Outstanding Director of a Play for John.

He directed The Flick in its West End (and UK) premiere at the National Theatre's Dorfman Theatre, which opened in April 2016.<ref>Cavendish, Dominic. " The Flick: a gripping love triangle at the movies" The Telegraph, 20 April 2016</ref>

The CurtainUp reviewer wrote: "...as moved from page to stage by director Sam Gold and his ensemble, everything becomes remarkably and most effectively — enough so to make this a full-flavored theatrical meal.... LeFranc, like another Playwrights Horizon favorite, Annie Baker, has written exactly the kind of play that's director Sam Gold's forte. Like Baker's Circle Mirror Transformation, The Big Meal is a play in which nothing much happens, but everything does."

He directed a revival of Look Back in Anger for the Roundabout Theatre Company in 2012. David Finkle, in his review for TheaterMania of Look Back in Anger, wrote: "...there's no question the challenge director Sam Gold faced in mounting this possibly-dated work was finding an approach to the fire-brand script that would infuse it with the shock value it had at its debut. Not only has he met the test, Gold deserves a chorus of huzzahs for unmitigated audacity." He directed a staged concert presentation of The Cradle Will Rock for Encores! Off-Center in July 2013. David Finkle, reviewing for The Huffington Post, wrote: "The cast of the Encores! Off-Center concert production of Marc Blitzstein's once highly controversial first musical...are dressed in Clint Ramos's formal attire. The look, apparently chosen by the habitually iconoclastic director Sam Gold, is certainly nothing like what the original cast was intended to wear...is likely that he understands there's no point in expecting contemporary audiences to insert themselves fully into the context of the times.... That may be why Gold's presenting the work of art as simply as he does is so completely effective."

In regional theatre, he directed A Doll's House at the Williamstown Theatre Festival in 2011.

He directed Othello at the Off-Broadway New York Theatre Workshop, opening on November 22, 2016 in previews, officially on December 12, 2016 through January 18, 2017. The play stars David Oyelowo and Daniel Craig.

He directed the latest Broadway revival of The Glass Menagerie at the Belasco Theatre, which started previews on February 7, 2017. The play stars Sally Field and Joe Mantello.Vine, Hannah. "Sally Field’s Return to Broadway in 'Glass Menagerie' " Playbill, March 3, 2017 He also directed the new play by Lucas Hnath, A Doll's House, Part 2, which premiered on Broadway at the John Golden Theatre on April 1, 2017. It takes place 15 years after Henrik Ibsen's A Doll’s House concludes."

Gold directed a new production of William Shakespeare’s King Lear at the Cort Theatre, starring Glenda Jackson. The limited engagement began previews in March 2019 and officially opened on April 4.

He is currently directing and executive producing the half-hour comedy Compliance for FX from writer Sarah Burgess and produced by Scott Rudin. It stars Mary Louise Parker and Courtney B. Vance.

It has been announced that Gold would be directing a proposed film adaptation of Fun Home with Jake Gyllenhaal set to produce and star.

 Theatre credits 
As a director

Style
Patrick Pacheco, in an article in The Los Angeles Times, observed: "Critical reservations have been rare in Gold's rise as one of New York's hottest and busiest young directors, ever since the media hailed his subtle and effective production of Annie Baker's Circle Mirror Transformation at Playwrights Horizons in 2009... His restless energy is reflected in the sheer breadth and versatility of his career, from a puppet musical, Jollyship the Whizbang, to classics like Threepenny Opera and A Doll's House, to any number of new plays by Zoe Kazan (We Live Here), Dan LeFranc (The Big Meal, which he will direct at Playwrights Horizons in March) and Will Eno (The Realistic Joneses at Yale Rep in April)."

Mark Kennedy noted that "Fun Home is Gold's first crack at directing a traditional musical, and it joins a list of credits that seem to have little in common....
What connects them is Gold's love of working with a group of actors, whether they're the unknowns in the cast of The Flick or A-listers .... 'Always I start with the ensemble and I try to put all of the pressure on them. I try to make these productions where the show succeeds or fails completely on their shoulders,' he says.'No net. No fancy set pieces. No directing flourishes. Nothing that can save the show if the subtlety of the performances isn't riveting.'"

Personal life
Gold has been married to playwright Amy Herzog since 2011. According to an article in The Washington Post, Herzog and Gold "choose not to work together professionally, which is an interesting line to draw, given that Herzog often blurs the boundaries between art and actual family history." Gold is Jewish.

Awards and nominations
Source:

 2017 Tony Award Best Direction of a Play, A Doll's House, Part 2, nominee
 2016 Drama Desk Award Outstanding Director of a Play, John,  nominee
 2015 Tony Award Best Direction of a Musical, Fun Home, winner
 2014 Drama Desk Award Outstanding Director of a Musical, Fun Home, nominee
 2014 Obie Award, Musical Theater, Fun Home, winner
 2013 Drama Desk Award Outstanding Director of a Play, Uncle Vanya, nominee
 2013 Lucille Lortel Award Nomination, Outstanding Director, The Flick, nominee
 2012 Lucille Lortel Award Nomination, Outstanding Director, Look Back in Anger, nominee
 2012 Lucille Lortel Award, Outstanding Director, The Big Meal, winner
 2010 Drama Desk Award Outstanding Director of a Play,  Circle Mirror Transformation, nominee
 2010 Obie Award, Direction, Circle Mirror Transformation'', winner

References

External links

Living people
American theatre directors
Broadway theatre directors
Place of birth missing (living people)
Jewish American male actors
Tony Award winners
Cornell University alumni
Year of birth missing (living people)
21st-century American Jews